Fatal Experiments is a collection of three adventures published by Chaosium in 1990 for the horror role-playing game Call of Cthulhu, written by Russell Bullman, Gregory W. Detwiler, William Dunn, L.N. Isinwyll, Penelope Love, Kurt Miller, Kevin A. Ross, Richard Watts.

Plot summary
Fatal Experiments is a set of three adventures set in the 1920s: "Tatterdemallion", "The Songs of Fantari", and "The Lurker in the Crypt". The scenarios are sequentially linked, and involve investigation of a dangerous research project.

Reception
In the February 1992 edition of Dragon (Issue #178), Rick Swan called this supplement "Another first-class collection of short scenarios for Chaosiums Call of Cthulhu game." He found that all three of the scenarios were "full of surprises and are delightfully disgusting."

Reviews
White Wolf #26 (April/May, 1991)

References

Call of Cthulhu (role-playing game) adventures
Role-playing game supplements introduced in 1990